John Henry Scott (born January 24, 1952) is a former Major League Baseball outfielder who played for three seasons. He played with the San Diego Padres from 1974 to 1975 and the Toronto Blue Jays in 1977, playing in 118 career games.

Playing career

San Diego Padres (1974-1975)
Scott was selected by the San Diego Padres with the second overall pick in the 1970 MLB Draft.  He made his Major League debut with the Padres on September 7, 1974, going 0 for 1 in a game against the Houston Astros.  On September 25, Scott collected his first career hit, a single off Mike Caldwell of the San Francisco Giants.  Scott finished the 1974 season with a .067 batting average in 14 games.

He spent the most of the 1975 season in the minor leagues, but Scott appeared in 25 games with the Padres, going hitless in nine at-bats.  In 1976, he played the entire season with the Hawaii Islanders of the Pacific Coast League.  On October 22, 1976, the Toronto Blue Jays purchased Scott's contract from the Padres.

Toronto Blue Jays (1977)
Scott was the Toronto Blue Jays opening day left fielder in their first ever game on April 7, 1977, and was the first batter in team history, leading off the bottom of the first inning, as Chicago White Sox starting pitcher Ken Brett struck him out. He finished the game going 1 for 5 with a double.  

Used infrequently during the opening weeks of the season, often as a defensive replacement or pinch runner, Scott compiled only 27 plate appearances in the team's first 37 games.  However, on May 20, he became the Blue Jays regular starting center fielder, a position he held through mid-July.

On June 5, Scott hit his first career home run off Vida Blue of the Oakland Athletics.  He hit his second, and last, two days later off the California Angels' Paul Hartzell.  This capped a 10-game hit streak for Scott, the longest of his career.

Over the next month (June 8 to July 11), Scott cooled off, hitting just .186 over a 27-game stretch.  By mid-July, Scott was platooning in left field with Alvis Woods.  Woods quickly assumed the lion's share of the playing time in left, and by September, Scott was essentially once again a pinch runner and occasional defensive replacement.

Scott ended the season appearing in 79 games with the club, batting .240 with 2 HR and 15 RBI, while finishing second on the Blue Jays with 10 stolen bases.  

On December 16, the Blue Jays traded Scott to the St. Louis Cardinals to complete an earlier deal in which they traded Pete Vuckovich to St. Louis for Victor Cruz and Tom Underwood.

Post-major league career
Scott would not appear in another Major League Baseball game as he spent the entire 1978 season with the Cardinals AAA affiliate, the Springfield Redbirds of the American Association.  He ended his MLB career having played in 118 games, recording 57 hits, batting .222, with 2 HR and 15 RBI, while stealing 13 bases. 

On October 23, 1978, the Cardinals traded Scott to the Chicago White Sox for Jim Willoughby, however, Scott would go on to play with the Yakult Swallows of Nippon Professional Baseball from 1979-1981.  He hit .262 with 48 HR, 159 RBI, and 43 stolen bases over his three seasons with the Swallows.

External links

1952 births
Living people
Alacranes de Campeche players
Alexandria Aces players
American expatriate baseball players in Canada
American expatriate baseball players in Japan
American expatriate baseball players in Mexico
Baseball players from Jackson, Mississippi
Hawaii Islanders players
Lodi Padres players
Major League Baseball outfielders
Nippon Professional Baseball outfielders
San Diego Padres players
Springfield Redbirds players
Toronto Blue Jays players
Tri-City Padres players